Nøtterøy is an island and a former municipality in the present-day municipality of Færder in Vestfold and Telemark county, Norway.  The administrative centre of the municipality was the village of Borgheim. The parish of Nøtterø was established as a municipality on 1 January 1838 (see formannskapsdistrikt). Two islands were later transferred from the municipality of Stokke to Nøtterøy: Håøya (in 1901) and Veierland (in 1964).

The whole municipality was made up of a small island group south of Tønsberg municipality, including the islands of Nøtterøy, Føynland, Veierland, and about 175 smaller islands. Nøtterøy includes the villages of Borgheim, Glomstein, Teie, and Torød. As 2010, 16,418 of the municipality lived within the town of Tønsberg, an urban area shared between the two municipalities.

It is the largest island in Vestfold County. The highest point on Nøtterøy Island is Vetan with an elevation of 99.7 meters. The mountain has been operated by the Norwegian Armed Forces since 1897. The military currently operates a radio station at Vetan.

General information

Nøtterøy Church
Nøtterøy Church (Nøtterøy kirke) is the main church in Nøtterøy parish.  The church was originally built ca. 1100. It was constructed of the granite in Romanesque architecture style. The church was extended eastward  in 1839 and 1883.  In the midst of the church hangs a huge chandelier, which was bestowed as gift in 1868. It has approximately 600 seats and two galleries. Nøtterøy rectory is located west of church.

Name
The Old Norse form of the name was Njótarvin (Njotarin) from Njót and vin. The name of the island "Njót" and "vin" meaning pastures or farm.
The name is probably derived from the verb njóta which means to "enjoy" or "benefit from".  Prior to 1918, the island was known by its Riksmål name, "Nøtterø".

Coat-of-arms

The coat-of-arms is from modern times.  They were granted on 24 October 1986.  The arms show a silver anchor on a blue background.  It is an appropriate symbol for the municipality which consists of islands and is dependent on fishing and sailing. The anchor was already used in the 17th century as a local symbol.

Notable residents
Trygve Bratteli, Prime minister of Norway
Fred Anton Maier, speed skater
Jan P. Syse, Prime minister of Norway
Tor Thodesen, Professional football manager

References

External links

Municipal fact sheet from Statistics Norway

Remnants of the German gun battery from WW2
Nøtterøy kulturhus website

 
Islands of Vestfold og Telemark
Færder
Former municipalities of Norway
Populated places disestablished in 2018